Sacoșu Turcesc is a commune in Timiș County, Romania. It is composed of seven villages: Berini, Icloda, Otvești, Sacoșu Turcesc (commune seat), Stamora Română, Uliuc and Unip.

Name

History 
The first recorded mention of Sacoșu Turcesc dates from 1321, when, in a Hungarian noble diploma, the village of Zekes, belonging to Szörény County, is mentioned. Also here is attested from 1440 a castle, which belonged to the Hungarian noble family Kórógy. In 1459 the castle came into the possession of the Hungarian king Matthias Corvinus, and then he ceded it to the Hungarian noble family . In 1473 the castle was owned by Ioan Ungur of Nădăștia and the Szobi family. From 1507, the ownership of the castle is taken over by István Werbőczy.

The word Turcesc ("Turkish") in the name of the locality does not indicate, as it seemed at first sight, the ethnicity of the villagers, but the Ottoman suzerainty under which the locality was at one time. This is to distinguish it from Sacoșu Mare, which was also called Sacoșu Unguresc, because it was in the part of Banat attached to Transylvania during the time of Temeşvar Eyalet.

The Franciscan monastery here, founded by King Charles Robert in 1366, was destroyed during the Ottoman occupation.

Demographics 

Sacoșu Turcesc had a population of 3,307 inhabitants at the 2011 census, up 5% from the 2002 census. Most inhabitants are Romanians (79.59%), larger minorities being represented by Hungarians (7.32%) and Roma (4.93%). For 7.53% of the population, ethnicity is unknown. By religion, most inhabitants are Orthodox (80.44%), but there are also minorities of Roman Catholics (6.5%), Pentecostals (2.12%) and Reformed (1.39%). For 7.68% of the population, religious affiliation is unknown.

References 

Communes in Timiș County
Localities in Romanian Banat